Look ( Luk) is a  modeling agency founded in 1988. Since 2005, it has been owned by Amelia Hayes. Every year the winner of Miss Israel is given a contract, together with the weekly magazine La'Isha.

Models
Galit Gutmann
Sivan Klein
Michael Lewis
Raz Meirman
Chava Mond
Hilla Nachshon

See also
Israeli fashion
 List of modeling agencies

References

External links
Official website

Yedioth Ahronoth
Entertainment companies of Israel
Entertainment companies established in 1988
Modeling agencies
Companies based in Tel Aviv
1988 establishments in Israel